The 2014 Tallahassee Tennis Challenger was a professional tennis tournament played on hard courts. It was the 15th edition of the tournament which was part of the 2014 ATP Challenger Tour. It took place in Tallahassee, Florida, United States between 28 April and 3 May 2014.

Singles main-draw entrants

Seeds

Other entrants
The following players received wildcards into the singles main draw:
  Cristian Gonzalez Mendez
  Collin Altamirano
  Dennis Nevolo
  Jean-Yves Aubone

The following players received entry from the qualifying draw:
  Ryan Agar
  Evan King
  Bjorn Fratangelo
  Mitchell Krueger

Doubles main-draw entrants

Seeds

Other entrants
The following pairs received wildcards into the doubles main draw:
  Benjamin Lock /  Marco Aurelio Nunez
  Collin Altamirano /  Alex Rybakov
  Bjorn Fratangelo /  Mitchell Krueger

The following pair received entry from the qualifying draw:
  Philip Lang /  Gerald Melzer

Champions

Singles

  Robby Ginepri def.  Frank Dancevic, 6–3, 6–4

Doubles

  Ryan Agar /  Sebastian Bader def.  Bjorn Fratangelo /  Mitchell Krueger, 6–4, 7–6(7–3)

External links
Official Website

Tallahassee Tennis Challenger
Tallahassee Tennis Challenger
Tallahassee Tennis
Tallahassee Tennis Challenger
Tallahassee Tennis Challenger